Reinaldo Valiente (born 13 July 1958) is a Cuban boxer. He competed in the men's lightweight event at the 1976 Summer Olympics. In his first fight, he beat Antonio Rubio of Spain, before being eliminated by Ace Rusevski of Yugoslavia.

References

1958 births
Living people
Cuban male boxers
Olympic boxers of Cuba
Boxers at the 1976 Summer Olympics
Place of birth missing (living people)
Lightweight boxers